The flag of Krasnoyarsk Krai, in the Russian Federation, is a red field charged with the krai's coat of arms in the center. Two fifths of the flag's height, it displays a golden lion holding a sickle in its left hand and a shovel in its right hand.  The lion is surrounded by a golden wreath of cedar and oak leaves as well as a light blue ribbon on the left, right, and bottom sides. A golden pedestal encloses the lion at the top. The flag was adopted on 16 March 2000.

References
Flags of the World

Flags of the federal subjects of Russia
Flag
Krasnoyarsk
Flags displaying animals
Flags of the Arctic